Cardopomyia is a genus of flies in the family Stratiomyidae. The genus is endemic to Madagascar.

Species
Cardopomyia parvicornis (Lindner, 1959)
Cardopomyia robusta Kertész, 1916
Physometopon vesicularis Lindner, 1966

References

Stratiomyidae
Brachycera genera
Taxa named by Kálmán Kertész
Diptera of Africa